Semyonovsky (masculine), Semyonovskaya (feminine), or Semyonovskoye (neuter) may refer to:
Semyonovsky District, former district of Nizhny Novgorod Oblast, Russia
Semyonovsky Urban Okrug, a municipal formation of Nizhny Novgorod Oblast, Russia, which the town of Semyonov is incorporated as
Semyonovsky Municipal Okrug, a municipal okrug of Admiralteysky District of St. Petersburg, Russia
Semyonovsky (rural locality) (Semyonovskaya, Semyonovskoye), name of several rural localities in Russia
Semyonovskaya (Moscow Metro), a station of the Moscow Metro, Moscow, Russia
Semyonovsky Island
Semyonovsky Regiment, a guards regiment in the Imperial Russian Army